Greatest Hits is a greatest hits collection by the American rock band Alice in Chains. It was released on July 24, 2001, on Columbia Records.

Overview
Greatest Hits is the second collection of hit songs by the band, albeit shorter than the previous release, Nothing Safe: Best of the Box. Greatest Hits was certified gold by the RIAA on November 30, 2005.
It was the last album released by Alice in Chains before the death of singer Layne Staley in 2002. Mike Starr plays bass on the album's first five songs, while Mike Inez plays bass on the last five.

Album cover
The album featured two covers. The first cover features a photo of boxer Gene Fullmer receiving a crushing right from Neal Rivers during their 10-round bout at Madison Square Garden on November 15, 1957. The unofficial second cover features an image of the members of the band's heads from the Facelift photoshoot without the text on the cover.

Reception

The album received a mixed reception from critics, with reviewers criticizing the lack of songs and "Cash grab" nature of the album. AllMusic's Steve Huey called the album "a lower-priced, ten-track sampler of Alice in Chains' career." Bill Adams of Ground Control Magazine questioned the integrity of the album, writing in his review "one has to wonder who this compilation was made for. When it was released in 2001, Alice in Chains had only gone for about six years without a new studio album, and fans had been kept interested with live albums, box sets, and myriad other releases, so why put out something so plainly utilitarian?".

Track listing

Personnel
Layne Staley – lead vocals, backing vocals on "No Excuses", "Grind" and "Heaven Beside You" and guitar on "Angry Chair"
Jerry Cantrell – lead guitar, backing vocals and lead vocals on "No Excuses", "Grind" and "Heaven Beside You"
Mike Starr – bass (tracks 1–5)
Mike Inez – bass (tracks 6–10), additional backing vocals on "Again"
Sean Kinney – drums
Bryan Carlstrom – engineer
Ronnie S. Champagne – engineer
Dave Jerden – producer, engineer, mixing
Stephen Marcussen – mastering
Rick Parashar – producer, engineer, mixing
Toby Wright – producer, engineer, mixing
Tom Nellen – engineer
Rocky Schenck – photography
Mary Maurer – art direction
Marty Temme – photography
Elliott Blakey – engineer

Chart positions

Certifications

References

2001 greatest hits albums
Alice in Chains compilation albums
Albums produced by Toby Wright
Columbia Records compilation albums